Norethisterone enanthate (NETE), also known as norethindrone enanthate, is a form of hormonal birth control which is used to prevent pregnancy in women. It is used both as a form of progestogen-only injectable birth control and in combined injectable birth control formulations. It may be used following childbirth, miscarriage, or abortion. The failure rate per year in preventing pregnancy for the progestogen-only formulation is 2 per 100 women. Each dose of this form lasts two months with only up to two doses typically recommended.

Side effects include breast pain, headaches, depression, irregular menstrual periods, and pain at the site of injection. Use in those with liver disease is not recommended as is use during pregnancy due to risk of birth defects. Use appears to be okay during breastfeeding. It does not protect against sexually transmitted infections. NETE is an ester and prodrug of norethisterone, through which it works. It works as a method of birth control by stopping ovulation.

Norethisterone was patented in 1951 and NETE came into medical use in 1957. It is on the World Health Organization's List of Essential Medicines. It has been approved by itself in more than 60 countries including the United Kingdom and some in Europe, Central America, and Africa, and in combination with estradiol valerate in at least 36 countries mainly in Latin America. It is not available in the United States.

Medical uses
NETE is used on its own as a long-lasting progestogen-only injectable contraceptive in women. It is administered via intramuscular injection once every two months.

Contraindications

Side effects

Side effects of NETE may include breast pain, headaches, depression, irregular menstrual periods, and pain at the site of injection. It can cause birth defects in the fetus if used during pregnancy.

Overdose

Interactions

Pharmacology

Pharmacodynamics
NETE is a prodrug of norethisterone in the body. Upon reaching circulation, it is rapidly converted into norethisterone by esterases. Hence, as a prodrug of norethisterone, NETE has essentially the same effects as norethisterone, acting as a potent progestogen with additional weak androgenic and estrogenic activity (the latter via its metabolite ethinylestradiol). NETA has some progestogenic activity of its own, but it is unclear if NETE does similarly.

NETE is of about 38% higher molecular weight than norethisterone due to the presence of its C17β enanthate ester.

A single intramuscular injection of estradiol valerate/norethisterone enanthate (5 mg/50 mg) (Mesigyna) has been found to strongly suppress testosterone levels in men. Levels of testosterone decreased from ~503 ng/dL at baseline to ~30 ng/dL at the lowest point (–94%).

Pharmacokinetics

A single intramuscular injection of 50 to 200 mg NETE in oil solution has been found to have a duration of action of 11 to 52 days in terms of clinical biological effect in the uterus and on body temperature in women.

Similarly to oral norethisterone and norethisterone acetate, intramuscular NETE has been found to form ethinylestradiol as an active metabolite. With a single intramuscular injection of 200 mg NETE in premenopausal women, the mean maximum concentration of ethinylestradiol was 32% of that of a combined oral contraceptive containing 30 μg ethinylestradiol, the maximum equivalent oral dose of ethinylestradiol observed in the first few days of exposure was 20.3 μg/day, and the mean equivalent oral dose of ethinylestradiol over 8 weeks was 4.41 μg/day. As such, the exposure to ethinylestradiol was described as markedly lower than that of an oral contraceptive containing 30 μg ethinylestradiol. The estimated conversion rate of NETE into ethinylestradiol was 0.1%, which was much lower than that observed for oral norethisterone and norethisterone enanthate (0.2–1.0%), likely due to the lack of the first pass through the liver with parenteral administration. In accordance with the low levels of ethinylestradiol produced, no increase rates of thromboembolism or hepatic adenoma have been observed in post-authorization data of intramuscular NETE, and the medication does not resemble combined oral contraceptives containing ethinylestradiol in its safety profile.

Chemistry

NETE, also known as norethinyltestosterone enanthate, as well as 17α-ethynyl-19-nortestosterone 17β-enanthate or 17α-ethynylestr-4-en-17β-ol-3-one 17β-enanthate, is a progestin, or synthetic progestogen, of the 19-nortestosterone group, and a synthetic estrane steroid. It is the C17β enanthate ester of norethisterone. NETE is a derivative of testosterone with an ethynyl group at the C17α position, the methyl group at the C19 position removed, and an enanthate ester attached at the C17β position. In addition to testosterone, it is a combined derivative of nandrolone (19-nortestosterone) and ethisterone (17α-ethynyltestosterone). Esters related to NETE include norethisterone acetate and levonorgestrel butanoate.

History
NETE was introduced by Schering as Noristerat in 1957. It was the second long-acting progestogen to be used clinically, after hydroxyprogesterone caproate. The medication was the first progestogen-only injectable contraceptive, preceding medroxyprogesterone acetate (Depo-Provera).

Society and culture

Generic names
NETE is known by its former developmental code name SH-393 as well.

Brand names
NETE has been marketed alone as a progestogen-only injectable contraceptive under the brand names Depocon, Doryxas, NET-EN, Noristat, Noristerat, Norigest, and Nur-Isterate, and in combination with estradiol valerate as a combined injectable contraceptive under the brand names Chinese Injectable No. 3, Ginediol, Mesigyna, Mesilar, Meslart, Mesocept, Mesygest, Nofertyl, Nofertyl Lafrancol, Noregyna, Norestrin, Norifam, Norigynon, Nostidyn, Sexseg, and Solouna.

Availability
NETE has been approved for use alone as a progestogen-only injectable contraceptive in more than 60 countries throughout the world including in Europe, Latin America, Asia, and Africa. Specific countries in which NETE as a standalone medication is or has been available include Bangladesh, France, Germany, India, Italy, Malaysia, Mexico, the Philippines, Singapore, South Africa, Thailand, and the United Kingdom.

NETE has been approved for use in combination with estradiol valerate as a combined injectable contraceptive in at least 36 countries, mostly in Latin America but also in Africa. It is or has been available in combination with estradiol valerate in Argentina, the Bahamas, Barbados, Bolivia, Brazil, Chile, Colombia, Costa Rica, the Dominican Republic, Ecuador, Egypt, El Salvador, Ghana, Grenada, Guatemala, Guyana, Haiti, Honduras, Jamaica, Kenya, Mexico, Nicaragua, Panama, Paraguay, Peru, St. Lucia, Turkey, Uruguay, Venezuela, and Zimbabwe.

NETE is not available in any form in the United States.

Research
NETE was studied by Schering for use as a progestogen-only injectable contraceptive at a dose of 25 mg once a month but produced poor cycle control with this regimen and was not marketed.

NETE has been studied for use as a potential male hormonal contraceptive in combination with testosterone in men.

See also
 Estradiol valerate/norethisterone enanthate
 Estradiol undecylate/norethisterone enanthate

References

External links 
 

1951 introductions
Androgens and anabolic steroids
Enanthate esters
Estranes
Prodrugs
Progestogen esters
Progestogens
Wikipedia medicine articles ready to translate
Synthetic estrogens
World Health Organization essential medicines